The Ann Arbor News is a newspaper serving Washtenaw and Livingston counties in Michigan. Published daily online through MLive.com, the paper also publishes print editions on Thursdays and Sundays.

History

Original publication
Published in Ann Arbor under various names from 1835 to 2009, The News was part of Booth Newspapers, owned by Advance Publications Inc. The News was published in the afternoons Monday through Friday and in the mornings on weekends and holidays. It published special sections throughout the year.

The newspaper ended its 174-year print run on July 23, 2009.  The publisher blamed the loss of classified advertising revenue (which moved to Craigslist), and noted "the seven-day-a-week print model just is not sustainable here. We have very low home ownership. The population is transient and young. Those demographics have worked against us."

Web site
The Ann Arbor News was replaced by a Web site, AnnArbor.com, which carried daily news stories and was accompanied by print editions on Thursdays and Sundays. Of the 272 people employed as of the announcement of the paper's closing, "more than a dozen" were hired for AnnArbor.com.

The closure also ended Livingston Community News, a free weekly newspaper for Livingston County published from 2003 to 2009 by the Ann Arbor News.

The company closed the Ann Arbor Business Review at the same time and moved the weekly publication under the brand of AnnArbor.com. Several employees of Ann Arbor Business Review were hired by the new company.

The Ann Arbor News is believed to be the first daily newspaper to fail in an American city with only one for-profit daily newspaper. (A Monday-through-Friday paper, The Michigan Daily, is the student newspaper of the University of Michigan and is non-profit.)

Renaming
In 2013 AnnArbor.com was transitioned to MLive.com along with Advance Publications' other Michigan newspapers and renamed The Ann Arbor News.

Awards
1982 Penney-Missouri Award General Excellence

Building

From 1936 until its closing in 2009, The Ann Arbor News owned and occupied a three story art deco style building at the corner of Huron and Division streets in downtown Ann Arbor. It is the only commercial building in the city designed by famed architect Albert Kahn. The building was sold to the University of Michigan Credit Union in 2010.

References

External links

 Closing of the original Ann Arbor News
 The Ann Arbor News (Archive)

Advance Publications
Mass media in Ann Arbor, Michigan
Newspapers published in Michigan
Publications established in 1835